Lindsay Thorngren (born December 5, 2005) is an American figure skater. She is the 2022 CS Golden Spin of Zagreb champion and 2022 Challenge Cup silver medalist. She is also the 2022 World Junior bronze medalist, the 2021 JGP France I champion, and the 2020 U.S. national junior champion.

Personal life 
Thorngren was born on December 5, 2005, in White Plains, New York, to parents Edward and Elizabeth. Her mother, Elizabeth, is from the Dominican Republic.
She has an older sister named Avrianny and a younger sister named Elaura.

Career

Early years 
Thorngren began learning to skate in 2009 as a four-year-old in Maple Grove, Minnesota. She participated in her first competition in 2010 at the age of five. She began training under her current coach, Julia Lautowa when her family relocated from Minnesota to New Jersey. Thorngren competed at her first U.S. Championship in 2017 at the juvenile level, where she finished sixth. She went on to win the U.S. intermediate women's title in 2019 and the junior title in 2020.

2019–20 season: Junior international debut 
Thorngren made her junior international debut on the Junior Grand Prix in September at the 2019 JGP Poland, where she placed eighth. In January, she won the US junior national title, earning an assignment to the 2020 World Junior Championships. She placed twenty-sixth in the short program, failing to advance to the free skate.

2020–21 season 
With the COVID-19 pandemic resulting in the cancellation of the international junior season, Thorngren's lone major appearance was in making her domestic senior debut at the 2021 U.S. Championships. She finished in sixth place.

2021–22 season: World Junior bronze 
Thorngren was a fan of the Netflix miniseries The Queen's Gambit, choosing to skate her free program to Carlos Rafael Rivera's original score for the program and portray lead character Beth Harmon. She analogized that Harmon "falls in love with chess, competes, and she fights to win a chess game. So in my program, I'm fighting to land all my jumps and skate cleanly and perform the best I can."

Returning to the Junior Grand Prix, Thorngren's first assignment was the first edition of the 2021 JGP France in Courchevel. Due to French travel rules, Russian women's skaters who normally dominated the Junior Grand Prix could not participate in the event. Thorngren won the gold medal in Courchevel. Reflecting on the lack of junior events in the previous year, she said, "since there were no competitions, I worked more on building my skills and my jumps." At her second event, the 2021 JGP Slovenia, Thorngren won the bronze medal behind Russians Adeliia Petrosian and Sofia Samodelkina. She attempted a triple Axel in the free skate, but the jump was downgraded due to a forward landing. These results qualified her for the 2021–22 Junior Grand Prix Final, but it was subsequently canceled due to restrictions imposed as a result of the Omicron variant. Thorngren made her senior international debut at the 2021 CS Warsaw Cup, where she finished fifth.

Hoping to qualify for the American Olympic team at the 2022 U.S. Championships, Thorngren was fifth in the short program with a clean skate, only 1.20 points behind third-place Alysa Liu. However, she struggled in the free skate, falling on two jumps and underrotating two others. Seventh in that segment, Thorngren dropped to fifth overall. She was subsequently assigned to the International Challenge Cup, winning the silver medal.

Thorngren was assigned to compete at the 2022 World Junior Championships, but events would soon complicate the situation. Shortly after the conclusion of the 2022 Winter Olympics, Russia invaded Ukraine. As a result, the International Skating Union banned all Russian athletes from competing at ISU championships. As Russian women had dominated international figure skating in recent years, this had a significant impact on the field, and Thorngren was considered a medal contender. Due to both the invasion and the Omicron variant, the World Junior Championships could not be held as scheduled in Sofia in early March, and were rescheduled for mid-April in Tallinn. Thorngren finished fourth in the short program, 0.14 points behind third-place Yun Ah-sun of South Korea. She went on to place third in the free skate, rising to third overall, almost four points ahead of Yun. Standing on the podium alongside fellow American, Isabeau Levito, she concurred that "the medal is a reflection of our training and how hard we've worked this season, and I'm really happy."

2022–23 season 
In her first competition of the season, Thorngren won the silver medal at the Philadelphia Summer International. She was then assigned to the 2022 CS Finlandia Trophy on the Challenger series, where she finished in sixth place.

Thorngren was invited to make her Grand Prix debut at the 2022 Skate Canada International, coming ninth of twelve skaters. She finished fourth in the short program at her second event, the 2022 Grand Prix of Espoo, but dropped to sixth place after the free skate.

Programs

Competitive highlights 
GP: Grand Prix; CS: Challenger Series; JGP: Junior Grand Prix.

Detailed results 
Small medals for short and free programs awarded only at ISU Championships. Personal bests highlighted in bold.

Senior results

Junior results

References

External links 
 
 Lindsay Thorngren at U.S. Figure Skating

2005 births
Living people
American female single skaters
People from White Plains, New York
World Junior Figure Skating Championships medalists